Upernavik Kujalleq Heliport  is a heliport in Upernavik Kujalleq, a village in the Upernavik Archipelago of Avannaata municipality in northwestern Greenland. The heliport is considered a helistop, and is served by Air Greenland as part of a government contract.

Airlines and destinations 

Air Greenland operates government contract flights to villages in the Upernavik area. These mostly cargo flights are not featured in the timetable, although they can be pre-booked. Departure times for these flights as specified during booking are by definition approximate, with the settlement service optimized on the fly depending on local demand for a given day.

References

Airports in the Arctic
Heliports in Greenland
Upernavik Archipelago